Carlos Lozada Quirino (14 January 1910 – 20 May 1999) was a Philippine biographer and historian. Not only known for his works on biographies and history but also on varied subjects such as the old maps of the Philippines and the culinary legacy of the country.

Life 
Carlos Quirino was born on 14 January 1910. He was a nephew of Philippine president Elpidio Quirino. Quirino received his journalism degree in 1931 from the University of Wisconsin at Madison. Known for his early biography of Jose Rizal entitled "The Great Malayan" (1940), he also wrote several works on Philippine history, as well as biographies of President Manuel Quezon and the painter Damian Domingo.

Quirino joined the Philippine Army and became second lieutenant before the outbreak of World War II. During the Japanese occupation, he was forced to join the Bataan Death March but  escaped and joined the underground resistance.

Under President Diosdado Macapagal, Quirino became director of the National Library. He was also became the first director of the Ayala Museum in 1970.

In 1997 he was recognised as a National Artist of the Philippines for Historical Literature.

He died on 20 May 1999 at the age of 89.

Writing Style 
Quirino's style of writing took a liberal approach of putting narrative and storytelling in his biographies. His biography of Rizal is a good example of his playful writing, as it is evident that he transformed the thoughts of Rizal and other relevant individuals, occasionally breaking them into direct conversations.

Bibliography 
 Man of Destiny (1935)
 The Great Malayan (1940)
 Magsaysay and the Philippines (1958)
 Philippine Cartography (1959)
 Damian Domingo: First Eminent Filipino Painter (1961)
 History of the Philippine Sugar Industry (1974)
 Filipinos at War (1981)
 Amang, the Life and Times of Eulogio Rodriguez, Sr. (1983)

References 

1910 births
1999 deaths
20th-century Filipino historians
Carlos
Burials at the Libingan ng mga Bayani